Jeet Upendra is an Indian actor who has appeared in Malayalam, Gujarati and Hindi films. He started his career with many direct-to-video films like Aditya Pancholi starrer Abhishek, Scandal and Don 2 in the 1980s. Later he got offers for films like Afsana Pyaar Ka with Aamir Khan and Johnnie Walker, with Mammootty and acted as his brother. He often excelled in negative characters. He is  busy with many television serials as well.

Partial filmography 

Ishaara – 2008Hum Pyar Tumhi Se Kar Baithe – 2002Paiso Maro Parmeshwar – 2002 (Gujarati)Inteqam – 2001Miss 420 – 1998Maa Ki Mamta – 1995Johnnie Walker – 1992 (Malayalam)Panaah – 1992Baharon Ke Manzil – 1991Humne Pyar Kiya – 1991Afsana Pyaar Ka – 1991Lakhi Durga Saraswati – 1991Danga Fasaad – 1990

 Video films Naqli Chehra – 1989Don 2 – 1988Abhishek  – 1987Jazira –  1987Shahadat  – 1986Scandal'' – 1985

References

 http://www.bollywoodhungama.com/celebritymicro/index/id/23376

External links 

 

Living people
20th-century Indian male actors
Male actors in Malayalam cinema
Indian male film actors
Male actors in Hindi cinema
Male actors from Mumbai
21st-century Indian male actors
Male actors in Gujarati-language films
1964 births